The 2006 All-Ireland Senior Camogie Championship—known as the Gala All-Ireland Senior Camogie Championship for sponsorship reasons—was the high point of the 2006 season in the sport of Camogie. The championship was won for the 22nd time by Cork who defeated Tipperary by an eight-point margin in the final despite having lost to them in the group stages. Rena Buckley was player of the match. The attendance was 20,685, at the time the second highest in camogie history.

Format change
The championship was changed from knockout to a round-robin system for the first time in 2006. The system was retained despite some high-profile criticism. The six senior counties were all guaranteed a minimum of five competitive games, with the hope that standards all round would improve as a result of all the extra matches. Tipperary won their championship group game against Cork by 3-8 to 1-10 in Templemore with two goals from Emily Hayden and a third from Louise Young.  They eventually lost the All-Ireland final to the same opposition, something that was happen four times in the first six competitions under the new structure.

Group stages
For the final round of the championship Marie O'Connor arrived in Athenry by helicopter after attending her brother's wedding and scored 2-2 as her side Kilkenny defeated Galway 3-5 to 0-10. Wexford defeated Limerick 4-18 to 0-4 in their final group game in Bruff but still did not qualify for the semis.

Semi-finals
The closing stages were disappointing, Cork beating Galway by four points in a stop-start first semi-final and Claire Grogan’s sending Tipperary through to the final beating Kilkenny by five points in the second semi-final.

Final
For the first time in camogie history, the All Ireland finals did not produce a single goal. Play flowed better than in the semi-finals and just one of the game's 16 scores, Jennifer O'Leary's fourth and final point for Cork, came from a free. Joanne Ryan fought what one reporter described as “mammoth and fascinating tussle” at midfield with Briege Corkery. Jim O’Sullivan, Gaelic games correspondent of the Irish Examiner wrote:
Consistent with what the scoreline suggests, powerful defensive play was key to Cork retaining their title in style in yesterday’s Gala All-Ireland senior camogie championship final in Croke Park. Starting without five of the team which looked destined to win last year’s final until Cork produced five late points, Tipperary’s inexperience in attack was to undermine their challenge. The one-sided nature of the contest was primarily down to Cork’s superiority as a team, reflecting the confidence gained in victory 12 months ago and the determination to prove that it was no fluke.
Fintan McNamara of Clare refereed.

Final stages

References

External links

2006
2006
All-Ireland Senior Camogie Championship